Vamos Tirando is the fourth studio album by Spanish rock band Platero y Tú. It was produced by Platero y Tú, recorded in March 1993 and published by DRO on 30 April 1993.

Track listing

Personnel 
 Fito Cabrales: Vocals and guitar.
 Iñaki "Uoho" Antón: Guitar.
 Juantxu Olano: Bass.
 Jesús García: Drums.

References

External links 
 Platero y Tú official website (in Spanish)

1993 albums
Platero y Tú albums
Spanish-language albums